Modern Virgin is a 1954 Italian melodrama film. It stars actor Gabriele Ferzetti.

Plot 
The young Claudia wants to escape from the gray life of the provinces and aims for rich men, but each time with unhappy results. Only her brother can finally shake her from it.

Cast
 Vittorio De Sica: Antonio Valli 
 Gabriele Ferzetti: Gabriele Demico 
 May Britt: Claudia Bardi 
 Vittorio Sanipoli: Vittorio 
 Teresa Pellati: Annadora 
 Mirko Ellis: Giacomo 
 Luca Ronconi: Andrea Bardi 
 Tina Lattanzi: Sig.ra Bardi 
 Angiolo Nosei: Prof. Bardi 
 Giacomo Furia: Un commesso

References

External links

1954 films
Films directed by Marcello Pagliero
Films scored by Nino Rota
1950s Italian-language films
Melodrama films
Italian black-and-white films
Italian drama films
1954 drama films
1950s Italian films